Two ships of the Royal Norwegian Navy have borne the name HNoMS Draug, after the sea revenant Draugr:

  was a  launched in 1908 and sold for scrapping in 1944.
 HNoMS Draug (K676) was the ex-Canadian   launched in 1944 and transferred to the Royal Norwegian Navy in 1956. Scrapped in 1966.

Royal Norwegian Navy ship names